José Luiz Santos de Azevedo, commonly known as Zé Luiz (born 22 november 1929, date of death 18 May 1986) was a Brazilian basketball player who competed in the 1952 Summer Olympics and in the 1956 Summer Olympics.

References

1929 births
Year of death missing
Brazilian men's basketball players
Olympic basketball players of Brazil
Basketball players at the 1951 Pan American Games
Basketball players at the 1952 Summer Olympics
Basketball players at the 1956 Summer Olympics
Pan American Games competitors for Brazil